Novaya Moskva (lit. new Moscow) is the name of several rural localities in Russia:
Novaya Moskva, Bryansk Oblast, a settlement under the administrative jurisdiction of Krasnogorsky Settlement Administrative Okrug in Krasnogorsky District of Bryansk Oblast; 
Novaya Moskva, Nizhny Novgorod Oblast, a settlement in Tolsko-Maydansky Selsoviet of Lukoyanovsky District in Nizhny Novgorod Oblast
Novaya Moskva, Primorsky Krai, a village in Shkotovsky District of Primorsky Krai

See also
Troitsky Administrative Okrug and Novomoskovsky Administrative Okrug, two new administrative districts of Moscow, Russia